After independence in 1966, Guyana sought an influential role in international affairs, particularly among Third World and non-aligned nations. It served twice on the UN Security Council (1975–76 and 1982–83). Former Vice President, Deputy Prime Minister, and Attorney General Mohamed Shahabuddeen served a 9-year term on the International Court of Justice (1987–96).

Guyana has diplomatic relations with a wide range of nations, and these are managed primarily through its Ministry of Foreign Affairs. The European Union (EU), the Inter-American Development Bank (IDB), the UN Development Programme (UNDP), the World Health Organization (WHO), and the Organization of American States (OAS) have offices in Georgetown.

Regional relations 
Guyana strongly supports the concept of regional integration. It played an important role in the founding of the Caribbean Community and Common Market (CARICOM), but its status as the organization's poorest member limits its ability to exert leadership in regional activities. Guyana has sought to keep foreign policy in close alignment with the consensus of CARICOM members, especially in voting in the UN, OAS, and other international organizations.

International disputes
All of the area west of the Essequibo River claimed by Venezuela; Suriname claims area east of the Upper Courantyne.

Two neighbours have longstanding territorial disputes with Guyana. Since the 19th century, Venezuela has claimed all of Guyana west of the Essequibo River – 62% of Guyana's territory. At a meeting in Geneva in 1966, the two countries agreed to receive recommendations from a representative of the UN Secretary General on ways to settle the dispute peacefully. Diplomatic contacts between the two countries and the Secretary General's representative continue.

Guyana and Suriname also disputed their offshore maritime boundaries. This dispute flared up in June 2000 in response to an effort by a Canadian company to drill for oil under a Guyanese concession. Guyana regards its legal title to all of its territory as sound. However, the dispute with Suriname was arbitrated by the United Nations Convention on Law of the Sea and a ruling in favor of Guyana was announced in September 2007.

Crime
In 1993, Guyana ratified the 1988 Vienna Convention on illicit traffic in narcotic drugs and cooperates with US law enforcement agencies on counter-narcotics efforts. Guyana is also a member of the International Criminal Court with a Bilateral Immunity Agreement of protection for the US-military (as covered under Article 98).

Guyana has been considered a transshipment point for narcotics from South America, primarily Venezuela, to Europe and the United States and producer of cannabis.

Relations by country

List of countries which Guyana has diplomatic relations with:

 – 26 May 1966
 – 26 May 1966
 – 26 May 1966
 – 26 May 1966
 – 15 August 1966
 – 2 September 1966
 – 25 November 1966
 – 30 November 1966
 – 12 April 1967
 – 22 June 1967
 – 10 November 1967
 – 5 November 1968
 – 18 December 1968
 – 20 June 1969
 – 2 October 1969
 – 11 June 1969
 – 15 May 1970
 – 8 June 1970
 – 21 July 1970
 – 6 October 1970
 – 13 October 1970
 – 19 October 1970
 – 17 December 1970
 – 18 December 1970
 – 28 December 1970
 – December 1970
 – 11 February 1971
 – 10 June 1971
 – 17 July 1971
 – 22 July 1971
 – 10 September 1971
 – 11 February 1972
 – 24 March 1972
 – 10 June 1972
 – 27 June 1972
 – 9 August 1972
 – 6 October 1972
 – 8 December 1972
 – 3 April 1973
 – 1 March 1973
 – 16 March 1973
 – 2 May 1973
 – 14 May 1973
 – 19 June 1973
 – 20 June 1973
 – 10 July 1973
 – 5 September 1973
 – 17 April 1974
 – 18 May 1974
 – 2 July 1974
 – 14 July 1974
 – 1 September 1974
 – 22 September 1974
 – 25 October 1974
 – 11 November 1974
 – 19 April 1975
 – 10 June 1975
 – 16 June 1975
 – 21 August 1975
 – 28 October 1975
 – 25 November 1975
 – 12 March 1976
 – 26 April 1976
 – 2 August 1976
 – 20 September 1976
 – 25 March 1977
 – 24 May 1977
 – 24 July 1977
 – 3 November 1978
 – 5 December 1978
 – 22 February 1979
 – 2 April 1979
 – 14 May 1979
 – 14 May 1979
 – 25 June 1979
 – 2 August 1979
 – 25 August 1979
 – 12 October 1979
 – 27 October 1979
 – 16 November 1979
 – 15 December 1979
 – February 1980
 – 14 June 1980
 – 19 June 1980
 – 23 November 1981
 – 3 February 1982
 – 1 May 1985
 – 3 June 1985
 – 6 September 1986
 – 12 March 1987
 – 23 September 1987
 – 17 December 1987
 – 20 June 1990
 – 9 March 1992
 – 1 May 1992
 – 1 May 1992
 – 1 December 1992
 – 1 January 1993
 – 1 January 1993
 – 26 February 1993
 – 28 April 1993
 – 13 April 1994
 – 14 April 1994
 – 22 June 1994
 – 4 November 1994
 – 13 November 1994
 – 6 February 1995
 – 2 March 1995
 – 17 August 1995
 – 1 September 1995
 – 17 January 1996
 – 23 August 1996
 – 26 November 1996
 – 19 April 1997
 – 9 June 1997
 – 11 June 1997
 – 19 November 1997
 – 19 August 1998
 – 19 May 1999
 – 27 August 1999
 – 2 February 2000
 – 25 February 2000
 – 15 November 2001
 – 19 September 2002
 – 22 September 2003
 – 24 October 2003
 – 10 March 2005
 – 16 March 2005
 – 25 September 2006
 – 20 April 2007
 – 25 September 2008
 – 17 June 2009
 – 24 September 2009
 – 10 November 2009
 – 21 September 2011
 – 25 January 2012
 – 22 February 2012
 – 23 April 2012
 – 28 September 2012
 – 14 December 2012
 – 15 January 2013
 – 21 February 2013
 – 9 May 2013
 – 13 June 2013
 – 12 September 2013
 – 8 December 2014
 – 23 September 2016
 – 17 February 2019
 – 24 August 2022
 – 19 September 2022
 – 10 October 2022
 – Unknown date
 – Unknown date

Africa

Americas

Asia

Europe

Oceania

See also
Ministry of Foreign Affairs (Guyana)
List of diplomatic missions in Guyana
List of diplomatic missions of Guyana

References and notes

 
Politics of Guyana